In set theory, the Schröder–Bernstein theorem states that, if there exist injective functions  and  between the sets  and , then there exists a bijective function .

This is a useful feature in the ordering of cardinal numbers.

The theorem is named after Felix Bernstein and Ernst Schröder. 
It is also known as Cantor–Bernstein theorem, or Cantor–Schröder–Bernstein, after Georg Cantor who first published it without proof.

Proof

The following proof is attributed to Julius König.

Assume without loss of generality that A and B are disjoint.

Therefore, the sequences form a partition of the (disjoint) union of A and B. Hence it suffices to produce a bijection between the elements of A and B in each of the sequences separately, as follows:

Call a sequence an A-stopper if it stops at an element of A, or a B-stopper if it stops at an element of B. Otherwise, call it doubly infinite if all the elements are distinct or cyclic if it repeats. See the picture for examples.
 For an A-stopper, the function  is a bijection between its elements in A and its elements in B.
 For a B-stopper, the function  is a bijection between its elements in B and its elements in A.
 For a doubly infinite sequence or a cyclic sequence, either  or  will do ( is used in the picture).

Another proof 
Let  and  be the two injective functions.

Now  defines a bijective function .

For the proof let's first observe that 
  is indeed a function: If  then  and if  then  exists and is one element from the set  since  is injective.

  is injective: Assume 
 and if  then  that implies 
  is impossible since  would mean  and hence  (!) And for  one also gets a contradiction.

  is surjective: Let 
 if  then  since  is injective. Now  but  and hence . So together  and therefore  So  has the property .
Q.E.D.

Examples 
Bijective function from  
Note:  is the half open set from 0 to 1, including the boundary 0 and excluding the boundary 1.
In line with that procedure 

Bijective function from 
Let   with   
and now one can set  which defines an injective function .
In this case  is still easy but already  gets quite complicated.
Note: Of course there's a more simple way by using the (already bijective) function definition .

History 
The traditional name "Schröder–Bernstein" is based on two proofs published independently in 1898.
Cantor is often added because he first stated the theorem in 1887,
while Schröder's name is often omitted because his proof turned out to be flawed
while the name of Richard Dedekind, who first proved it, is not connected with the theorem.
According to Bernstein, Cantor had suggested the name equivalence theorem (Äquivalenzsatz).

 1887 Cantor publishes the theorem, however without proof.
 1887 On July 11, Dedekind proves the theorem (not relying on the axiom of choice) but neither publishes his proof nor tells Cantor about it. Ernst Zermelo discovered Dedekind's proof and in 1908 he publishes his own proof based on the chain theory from Dedekind's paper Was sind und was sollen die Zahlen?
 1895 Cantor states the theorem in his first paper on set theory and transfinite numbers. He obtains it as an easy consequence of the linear order of cardinal numbers. However, he could not prove the latter theorem, which is shown in 1915 to be equivalent to the axiom of choice by Friedrich Moritz Hartogs.
 1896 Schröder announces a proof (as a corollary of a theorem by Jevons).
 1897 Bernstein, a 19-year-old student in Cantor's Seminar, presents his proof.
 1897 Almost simultaneously, but independently, Schröder finds a proof.
 1897 After a visit by Bernstein, Dedekind independently proves the theorem a second time.
 1898 Bernstein's proof (not relying on the axiom of choice) is published by Émile Borel in his book on functions. (Communicated by Cantor at the 1897 International Congress of Mathematicians in Zürich.) In the same year, the proof also appears in Bernstein's dissertation.
 1898 Schröder publishes his proof which, however, is shown to be faulty by Alwin Reinhold Korselt in 1902 (just before Schröder's death), (confirmed by Schröder), but Korselt's paper is published only in 1911.

Both proofs of Dedekind are based on his famous 1888 memoir Was sind und was sollen die Zahlen? and derive it as a corollary of a proposition equivalent to statement C in Cantor's paper, which reads A ⊆ B ⊆ C and |A| = |C| implies |A| = |B| = |C|. Cantor observed this property as early as 1882/83 during his studies in set theory and transfinite numbers and was therefore (implicitly) relying on the Axiom of Choice.

Prerequisites
The 1895 proof by Cantor relied, in effect, on the axiom of choice by inferring the result as a corollary of the well-ordering theorem. However, König's proof given above shows that the result can also be proved without using the axiom of choice.

On the other hand, König's proof uses the principle of excluded middle to draw a conclusion through case analysis. As such, the above proof is not a constructive one. In fact, in a constructive set theory such as intuitionistic set theory , which adopts the full axiom of separation but dispenses with the principle of excluded middle, assuming the Schröder–Bernstein theorem implies the latter. In turn, there is no proof of König's conclusion in this or weaker constructive theories. Therefore, intuitionists do not accept the statement of the Schröder–Bernstein theorem.

There is also a proof which uses Tarski's fixed point theorem.

See also 
 Myhill isomorphism theorem
 Netto's theorem, according to which the bijections constructed by the Schröder–Bernstein theorem between spaces of different dimensions cannot be continuous
 Schröder–Bernstein theorem for measurable spaces
 Schröder–Bernstein theorems for operator algebras
 Schröder–Bernstein property

Notes

References 
 Martin Aigner & Gunter M. Ziegler (1998) Proofs from THE BOOK, § 3 Analysis: Sets and functions, Springer books , fifth edition 2014 , sixth edition 2018

External links

 
 
 Cantor-Bernstein’s Theorem in a Semiring by Marcel Crabbé.
 

Theorems in the foundations of mathematics
Cardinal numbers
Articles containing proofs